This is a list of notable Uruguayan Americans, including both original immigrants who obtained American citizenship and their American descendants. 

To be included in this list, the person must have a Wikipedia article showing they are Uruguayan American or must have references showing they are Uruguayan American and are notable.

List 
 Fede Álvarez (born 1978 in Montevideo) - filmmaker.
 Gisele Ben-Dor (born 1955 in Uruguay) - American-Israeli orchestra conductor
 Juan José Calandria (1902–1980) - painter and sculptor
 Luis Camnitzer (born 1937 in Lübeck, raised in Uruguay) - artist and academic 
 Jaime Carbonell (1953-2020) - computer scientist
 Natalia Cigliuti (born 1978 in Montevideo) - actress
 Fernando Clavijo (born 1956 in Maldonado, died 2019 in Fort Lauderdale) - footballer/soccer player
 Hiber Conteris (1933–2020) - writer, playwright, literary critic 
 David Cruz Thayne (born 1971 in Manchester, NH) - businessman
 George Davidsohn (born 1936 in Montevideo, died 2015 in New York City) - entrepreneur
 Miguel del Aguila - Uruguayan-born multiple Grammy nominated American composer
 Jonathan Del Arco (born 1966 in Uruguay) - actor and LGBT activist
 George DelHoyo (born 1953 in Canelones) - also known as George Deloy, actor
 José L. Duomarco (1905–1985) - medical scientist 
 Fernando Espuelas (born 1966 in Montevideo) - entrepreneur, author, media personality and philanthropist
 Diego Fagundez (born 1995 in Montevideo) - professional footballer for the New England Revolution of Major League Soccer
 Francisco Fattoruso (born 1979 in Las Vegas, Nevada) - musician, son of Hugo Fattoruso
 Cirilo “Pepe” Fernández (born 1943 in Uruguay) - former soccer forward, current soccer businessman 
 Bruno Fonseca (born 1958 in New York, died 1994 in East Hampton) - artist
 Caio Fonseca (born 1959 in New York) - painter, brother of Bruno Fonseca
 Isabel Fonseca (born 1961 in New York) - writer
 Rodolfo Gambini (born 1946 in Montevideo) - physicist and professor, working on loop quantum gravity
 Jorge Gestoso (born 1951 in Montevideo) - journalist and news anchor at CNN
 Enrique Graf (born 1953 in Montevideo) - musician
 Sebastián Guenzatti (born 1991 in Montevideo) - footballer
 Sampson Lewkowicz (born 1951 in Montevideo) - boxing promoter and manager
 Ricardo López (1975–1996) - also known as the "Björk stalker", pest control officer who attempted to kill musician Björk
 Jorge Majfud (born 1969 in Tacuarembó) - writer, professor at Jacksonville University
 Emir Rodríguez Monegal (1921–1985) - scholar, literary critic, professor of Latin American contemporary literature at Yale University 
 Joseph Jacinto "Jo" Mora (1876–1947) - cartoonist and artist 
 Martín Núñez (born 1987 in Montevideo) - footballer currently playing for Minnesota Stars FC in the North American Soccer League.
 Jorge Ottati Junior (born in Montevideo) - television and radio sports announcer at beIN SPORTS
 Pedro Piedrabuena (born 1971 in Montevideo) - professional three-cushion billiards player
 Daniel Pontet (born 1957 in Montevideo) - artist
 Jorge Ramos (born in Montevideo) - sports commentator at ESPN
 Tab Ramos (born 1966 in Montevideo) - former footballer/soccer player, whom also served as co-assistant to U.S. team manager Bob Bradley from 2007 to 2011
 Emir Rodríguez Monegal - (1921 – 1985) Uruguayan scholar, literary critic, writer and publisher of Latin American literature
 Rodrigo Santiago (born 1990 in Montevideo) - footballer
 Gabe Saporta (born 1979 in Montevideo) - vocalist of bands Midtown and Cobra Starship
 José Serebrier (born 1938 in Montevideo) - conductor and composer
 Pedro Sevcec (born 1950 in Montevideo) - television reporter who works for America TV / Miami in the United States
 Martin Sorrondeguy - singer of bands Los Crudos and Limp Wrist, the founder of Lengua Armada Discos, documentary film director
 Miguel Terekhov (1928–2012) - ballet dancer and ballet instructor 
 Carlos A. Vegh (born 1958 in Montevideo) - academic economist and Professor of Economics at the University of Maryland, son of former Finance Minister Alejandro Végh Villegas
 Agustín Viana (born 1983 in Chicago) - professional footballer
 Rafael Viñoly (born 1944 in Montevideo) - architect
 Ida Vitale (born 1923 in Montevideo) - prolific writer who played an important role in the Uruguayan art movement "Generation of 1945".
 Adrian Vallarino - TV and film producer and director 
 Gabriel Wilensky (born 1964 in Uruguay) - software developer, entrepreneur, and historian of the Holocaust
 Alejandro Zaffaroni (1923–2014) - biotechnological entrepreneur

References

Uruguayan Americans
Americans
Uruguayan
Uruguayan